Samuel Jamieson (born 14 March 1999) is a Scottish professional footballer who plays for Troon as a striker.

Career
Jamieson joined Rangers at the age of 7, and spent a loan spell with Stirling University, but left the club in June 2017. He then joined St Mirren, making his senior debut on 29 September 2018 in the Scottish Premiership. Jamieson moved on loan to Brechin City in February 2019.

Jamieson moved to Lowland league side East Kilbride for the 2019-20 season.

In July 2020 he signed for Albion Rovers. He signed for Troon in July 2021.

References

1999 births
Living people
Scottish footballers
Rangers F.C. players
University of Stirling F.C. players
St Mirren F.C. players
Scottish Professional Football League players
Association football forwards
Brechin City F.C. players
Place of birth missing (living people)
East Kilbride F.C. players
Albion Rovers F.C. players
Troon F.C. players
West of Scotland Football League players